Parliamentary elections were held in Mongolia on 21 June 1981. At the time, the country was a one-party state under the rule of the Mongolian People's Revolutionary Party. The MPRP won 344 of the 370 seats, with the remaining 26 seats going to non-party candidates, who had been chosen by the MPRP due to their social status. Voter turnout was reported to be 100%, with only five of the 792,896 registered voters failing to cast a ballot.

Results

References

Mongolia
1981 in Mongolia
Elections in Mongolia
One-party elections
Election and referendum articles with incomplete results